Samarium is a chemical element with symbol Sm and atomic number 62. It is a moderately hard silvery metal that slowly oxidizes in air. Being a typical member of the lanthanide series, samarium usually has the oxidation state +3. Compounds of samarium(II) are also known, most notably the monoxide SmO, monochalcogenides SmS, SmSe and SmTe, as well as samarium(II) iodide. The last compound is a common reducing agent in chemical synthesis. Samarium has no significant biological role, and some samarium salts are slightly toxic.

Samarium was discovered in 1879 by French chemist Paul-Émile Lecoq de Boisbaudran and named after the mineral samarskite from which it was isolated. The mineral itself was named after a Russian mine official, Colonel Vassili Samarsky-Bykhovets, who thus became the first person to have a chemical element named after him, albeit indirectly. Though classified as a rare-earth element, samarium is the 40th most abundant element in Earth's crust and more common than metals such as tin. Samarium occurs in concentration up to 2.8% in several minerals including cerite, gadolinite, samarskite, monazite and bastnäsite, the last two being the most common commercial sources of the element. These minerals are mostly found in China, the United States, Brazil, India, Sri Lanka and Australia; China is by far the world leader in samarium mining and production.

The main commercial use of samarium is in samarium–cobalt magnets, which have permanent magnetization second only to neodymium magnets; however, samarium compounds can withstand significantly higher temperatures, above , without losing their magnetic properties, due to the alloy's higher Curie point. The radioisotope samarium-153 is the active component of the drug samarium (153Sm) lexidronam (Quadramet), which kills cancer cells in lung cancer, prostate cancer, breast cancer and osteosarcoma. Another isotope, samarium-149, is a strong neutron absorber and so is added to control rods of nuclear reactors. It also forms as a decay product during the reactor operation and is one of the important factors considered in the reactor design and operation. Other uses of samarium include catalysis of chemical reactions, radioactive dating and X-ray lasers.

Physical properties

Samarium is a rare earth element with hardness and density similar to zinc. When freshly prepared, samarium has a silvery lustre, and takes on a duller appearance when oxidized in air. Samarium is also calculated to have one of the largest atomic radii of the elements; with a radius of 238 pm, only potassium, praseodymium, barium, rubidium and caesium have a larger one.

At ambient conditions, samarium normally has a rhombohedral structure (α form). Further heating to  transforms the metal into a body-centered cubic (bcc) phase. Heating to  plus compression to 40 kbar results in a double-hexagonally close-packed structure (dhcp). Higher pressure of the order of hundreds or thousands of kilobars induces a series of phase transformations, in particular with a tetragonal phase appearing at about 900 kbar. Also, thin films of samarium obtained by vapor deposition may contain the hcp or dhcp phases at ambient conditions.

Samarium and its sesquioxide are paramagnetic at room temperature. Their corresponding effective magnetic moments, below 2 bohr magnetons, are the third-lowest among lanthanides (and their oxides) after lanthanum and lutetium. The metal transforms to an antiferromagnetic state upon cooling to 14.8 K. Individual samarium atoms can be isolated by encapsulating them into fullerene molecules. They can also be doped (intentional adding of samarium atoms) between the C60 molecules in the fullerene solid, rendering it superconductive at temperatures below 8 K. Samarium doping of iron-based superconductors – a class of high-temperature superconductor – allows enhancing their transition temperature to 56 K, which is the highest value achieved so far in this series.

Chemical properties
Freshly prepared samarium has a silvery luster. Even when stored under mineral oil, samarium gradually oxidizes and develops a grayish-yellow powder of the oxide-hydroxide mixture at the surface. The metallic appearance of a sample can be preserved by sealing it under an inert gas such as argon.

Samarium is quite electropositive and reacts slowly with cold water and quite quickly with hot water to form samarium hydroxide:
 

Samarium dissolves readily in dilute sulfuric acid to form solutions containing the yellow to pale green Sm(III) ions, which exist as  complexes:

 

Samarium is one of the few lanthanides that exhibit the +2 oxidation state.  ions are blood-red in aqueous solution.

Compounds

Oxides
The most stable oxide of samarium is the sesquioxide Sm2O3. Like many samarium compounds, it exists in several crystalline phases. The trigonal form is obtained by slow cooling from the melt. The melting point of Sm2O3 is high (2345 °C), so it is usually melted not by direct heating, but with induction heating, through a radio-frequency coil. Sm2O3 crystals of monoclinic symmetry can be grown by the flame fusion method (Verneuil process) from Sm2O3 powder, that yields cylindrical boules up to several centimeters long and about one centimeter in diameter. The boules are transparent when pure and defect-free and are orange otherwise. Heating the metastable trigonal Sm2O3 to  converts it to the more stable monoclinic phase. Cubic Sm2O3 has also been described.

Samarium is one of the few lanthanides that form a monoxide, SmO. This lustrous golden-yellow compound was obtained by reducing Sm2O3 with samarium metal at high temperature (1000 °C) and pressure above 50 kbar; lowering the pressure resulted in incomplete reaction. SmO has cubic rock-salt lattice structure.

Chalcogenides

Samarium forms a trivalent sulfide, selenide and telluride. Divalent chalcogenides SmS, SmSe and SmTe with cubic rock-salt crystal structure are also known. These chalcogenides convert from semiconducting to metallic state at room temperature upon application of pressure. Whereas the transition is continuous and occurs at about 20–30 kbar in SmSe and SmTe, it is abrupt in SmS and requires only 6.5 kbar. This effect results in spectacular color change in SmS from black to golden yellow when its crystals of films are scratched or polished. The transition does not change lattice symmetry, but there is a sharp decrease (~15%) in the crystal volume. It exhibits hysteresis, i.e., when the pressure is released, SmS returns to the semiconducting state at a much lower pressure of about 0.4 kbar.

Halides

Samarium metal reacts with all the halogens, forming trihalides:
2 Sm (s) + 3 X2 (g) → 2 SmX3 (s) (X = F, Cl, Br or I)

Their further reduction with samarium, lithium or sodium metals at elevated temperatures (about 700–900 °C) yields dihalides. The diiodide can also be prepared by heating SmI3, or by reacting the metal with 1,2-diiodoethane in anhydrous tetrahydrofuran at room temperature:
Sm (s) + ICH2-CH2I → SmI2 + CH2=CH2.

In addition to dihalides, the reduction also produces many non-stoichiometric samarium halides with a well-defined crystal structure, such as Sm3F7, Sm14F33, Sm27F64, Sm11Br24, Sm5Br11 and Sm6Br13.

As reflected in the table above, samarium halides change their crystal structures when one type of halide anion is substituted for another, which is an uncommon behavior for most elements (e.g. actinides). Many halides have two major crystal phases for one composition, one being significantly more stable and another being metastable. The latter is formed upon compression or heating, followed by quenching to ambient conditions. For example, compressing the usual monoclinic samarium diiodide and releasing the pressure results in a PbCl2-type orthorhombic structure (density 5.90 g/cm3), and similar treatment results in a new phase of samarium triiodide (density 5.97 g/cm3).

Borides
Sintering powders of samarium oxide and boron, in vacuum, yields a powder containing several samarium boride phases, and their volume ratio can be controlled through the mixing proportion. The powder can be converted into larger crystals of a certain samarium boride using arc melting or zone melting techniques, relying on the different melting/crystallization temperature of SmB6 (2580 °C), SmB4 (about 2300 °C) and SmB66 (2150 °C). All these materials are hard, brittle, dark-gray solids with the hardness increasing with the boron content. Samarium diboride is too volatile to be produced with these methods and requires high pressure (about 65 kbar) and low temperatures between 1140 and 1240 °C to stabilize its growth. Increasing the temperature results in the preferential formations of SmB6.

Samarium hexaboride
Samarium hexaboride is a typical intermediate-valence compound where samarium is present both as Sm2+ and Sm3+ ions in a 3:7 ratio. It belongs to a class of Kondo insulators, that is at high temperatures (above 50 K), its properties are typical of a Kondo metal, with metallic electrical conductivity characterized by strong electron scattering, whereas at low temperatures, it behaves as a non-magnetic insulator with a narrow band gap of about 4–14 meV. The cooling-induced metal-insulator transition in SmB6 is accompanied by a sharp increase in the thermal conductivity, peaking at about 15 K. The reason for this increase is that electrons themselves do not contribute to the thermal conductivity at low temperatures, which is dominated by phonons, but the decrease in electron concentration reduced the rate of electron-phonon scattering. New research seems to show that it may be a topological insulator.

Other inorganic compounds

Samarium carbides are prepared by melting a graphite-metal mixture in an inert atmosphere. After the synthesis, they are unstable in air and are studied also under inert atmosphere. Samarium monophosphide SmP is a semiconductor with the bandgap of 1.10 eV, the same as in silicon, and high electrical conductivity of n-type. It can be prepared by annealing at  an evacuated quartz ampoule containing mixed powders of phosphorus and samarium. Phosphorus is highly volatile at high temperatures and may explode, thus the heating rate has to be kept well below 1 °C/min.

Numerous crystalline binary compounds are known for samarium and one of the group 14, 15, or 16 elements X, where X is Si, Ge, Sn, Pb, Sb or Te, and metallic alloys of samarium form another large group. They are all prepared by annealing mixed powders of the corresponding elements. Many of the resulting compounds are non-stoichiometric and have nominal compositions SmaXb, where the b/a ratio varies between 0.5 and 3.

Organometallic compounds
Contrary to cyclopentadienides of most other lanthanides, in  some  rings bridge each other by forming ring vertexes η1 or edges η2 toward another neighboring samarium, thus creating polymeric chains. There, the chlorine bridges can be replaced, for instance, by iodine, hydrogen or nitrogen atoms or by CN groups.

The latter compound has a structure similar to uranocene.

A metathesis reaction in tetrahydrofuran or ether gives alkyls and aryls of samarium:

Here R is a hydrocarbon group and Me = methyl.

Isotopes

Naturally occurring samarium is composed of five stable isotopes: 144Sm, 149Sm, 150Sm, 152Sm and 154Sm, and two extremely long-lived radioisotopes, 147Sm (half-life t1/2 = 1.06 years) and 148Sm (7 years), with 152Sm being the most abundant (26.75%). 149Sm is listed by various sources mostly as stable, but some sources state that it is radioactive, with a lower bound for its half-life is given as  years. Some observationally stable samarium isotopes are predicted to decay to isotopes of neodymium. The long-lived isotopes 146Sm, 147Sm, and 148Sm undergo alpha decay to neodymium isotopes. Lighter unstable isotopes of samarium mainly decay by electron capture to promethium, while heavier ones beta decay to europium. Natural samarium has a radioactivity of 127 Bq/g, mostly due to 147Sm, which alpha decays to 143Nd with a half-life of 1.06 years and is used in samarium–neodymium dating. 146Sm can be used as an extinct radionuclide in radiometric dating. The known isotopes range from 129Sm to 168Sm. The half-lives of 151Sm and 145Sm are 90 years and 340 days, respectively. All remaining radioisotopes have half-lives that are less than 2 days, and most these have half-life less than 48 seconds. Samarium also has twelve known nuclear isomers, the most stable of which are 141mSm (half-life 22.6 minutes), 143m1Sm (t1/2 = 66 seconds), and 139mSm (t1/2 = 10.7 seconds).

Samarium-153 is a beta emitter with half-life 46.3 hours. It is used to kill cancer cells in lung cancer, prostate cancer, breast cancer, and osteosarcoma. For this purpose, samarium-153 is chelated with ethylene diamine tetramethylene phosphonate (EDTMP) and injected intravenously. The chelation prevents accumulation of radioactive samarium in the body that would result in excessive irradiation and generation of new cancer cells. The corresponding drug has several names including samarium (153Sm) lexidronam; its trade name is Quadramet.

History

Detection of samarium and related elements was announced by several scientists in the second half of the 19th century; however, most sources give priority to French chemist Paul-Émile Lecoq de Boisbaudran. Boisbaudran isolated samarium oxide and/or hydroxide in Paris in 1879 from the mineral samarskite ) and identified a new element in it via sharp optical absorption lines. Swiss chemist Marc Delafontaine announced a new element decipium (from  meaning "deceptive, misleading") in 1878, but later in 1880–1881 demonstrated that it was a mix of several elements, one being identical to Boisbaudran's samarium. Though samarskite was first found in the Ural Mountains in Russia, by the late 1870s it had been found in other places, making it available to many researchers. In particular, it was found that the samarium isolated by Boisbaudran was also impure and had a comparable amount of europium. The pure element was produced only in 1901 by Eugène-Anatole Demarçay.

Boisbaudran named his element samarium after the mineral samarskite, which in turn honored Vassili Samarsky-Bykhovets (1803–1870). Samarsky-Bykhovets, as the Chief of Staff of the Russian Corps of Mining Engineers, had granted access for two German mineralogists, the brothers Gustav and Heinrich Rose, to study the mineral samples from the Urals. Samarium was thus the first chemical element to be named after a person. The word samaria is sometimes used to mean samarium(III) oxide, by analogy with yttria, zirconia, alumina, ceria, holmia, etc. The symbol Sm was suggested for samarium, but an alternative Sa was often used instead until the 1920s.

Before the advent of ion-exchange separation technology in the 1950s, pure samarium had no commercial uses. However, a by-product of fractional crystallization purification of neodymium was a mix of samarium and gadolinium that got the name "Lindsay Mix" after the company that made it. This material is thought to have been used for nuclear control rods in some early nuclear reactors. Nowadays, a similar commodity product has the name "samarium-europium-gadolinium" (SEG) concentrate. It is prepared by solvent extraction from the mixed lanthanides isolated from bastnäsite (or monazite). Since heavier lanthanides have more affinity for the solvent used, they are easily extracted from the bulk using relatively small proportions of solvent. Not all rare-earth producers who process bastnäsite do so on a large enough scale to continue by separating the components of SEG, which typically makes up only 12% of the original ore. Such producers therefore make SEG with a view to marketing it to the specialized processors. In this manner, the valuable europium in the ore is rescued for use in making phosphor. Samarium purification follows the removal of the europium. , being in oversupply, samarium oxide is cheaper on a commercial scale than its relative abundance in the ore might suggest.

Occurrence and production

With the average concentration of about 8 parts per million (ppm), samarium is the 40th most abundant element in the Earth's crust. It is the fifth most abundant lanthanide and has a higher concentration than many other elements such as tin (which has an average concentration of 2 ppm). Samarium concentration in soils varies between 2 and 23 ppm, and oceans contain about 0.5–0.8 parts per trillion. Distribution of samarium in soils strongly depends on its chemical state and is very inhomogeneous: in sandy soils, samarium concentration is about 200 times higher at the surface of soil particles than in the water trapped between them, and this ratio can exceed 1,000 in clays.

Samarium is not found free in nature, but, like other rare earth elements, is contained in many minerals, including monazite, bastnäsite, cerite, gadolinite and samarskite; monazite (in which samarium occurs at concentrations of up to 2.8%) and bastnäsite are mostly used as commercial sources. World resources of samarium are estimated at two million tonnes; they are mostly located in China, US, Brazil, India, Sri Lanka and Australia, and the annual production is about 700 tonnes. Country production reports are usually given for all rare-earth metals combined. By far, China has the largest production with 120,000 tonnes mined per year; it is followed by the US (about 5,000 tonnes) and India (2,700 tonnes). Samarium is usually sold as oxide, which at the price of about US$30/kg is one of the cheapest lanthanide oxides. Whereas mischmetal – a mixture of rare earth metals containing about 1% of samarium – has long been used, relatively pure samarium has been isolated only recently, through ion exchange processes, solvent extraction techniques, and electrochemical deposition. The metal is often prepared by electrolysis of a molten mixture of samarium(III) chloride with sodium chloride or calcium chloride. Samarium can also be obtained by reducing its oxide with lanthanum. The product is then distilled to separate samarium (boiling point 1794 °C) and lanthanum (b.p. 3464 °C).

Very few minerals have samarium being the most dominant element. Minerals with essential (dominant) samarium include monazite-(Sm) and florencite-(Sm). These minerals are very rare and are usually found containing other elements, usually cerium or neodymium.

Samarium-151 is produced in nuclear fission of uranium with a yield of about 0.4% of all fissions. It is also made by neutron capture by samarium-149, which is added to the control rods of nuclear reactors. Therefore, Sm is present in spent nuclear fuel and radioactive waste.

Applications

They have high permanent magnetization, about 10,000 times that of iron and second only to neodymium magnets. However, samarium magnets resist demagnetization better; they are stable to temperatures above  (cf. 300–400 °C for neodymium magnets). These magnets are found in small motors, headphones, and high-end magnetic pickups for guitars and related musical instruments. For example, they are used in the motors of a solar-powered electric aircraft, the Solar Challenger, and in the Samarium Cobalt Noiseless electric guitar and bass pickups.

Another important use of samarium and its compounds is as catalyst and chemical reagent. Samarium catalysts help decomposition of plastics, dechlorination of pollutants such as polychlorinated biphenyls (PCB), as well as dehydration and dehydrogenation of ethanol. Samarium(II) iodide is a very common reducing and coupling agent in organic synthesis, for example in desulfonylation reactions; annulation; Danishefsky, Kuwajima, Mukaiyama and Holton Taxol total syntheses; strychnine total synthesis; Barbier reaction and other reductions with samarium(II) iodide. Samarium hexaboride, has recently been shown to be a topological insulator with potential uses in quantum computing.

In its usual oxidized form, samarium is added to ceramics and glasses where it increases absorption of infrared light. As a (minor) part of mischmetal, samarium is found in "flint" ignition device of many lighters and torches.

Samarium-149 has a high cross section for neutron capture (41,000 barns) and so is used in control rods of nuclear reactors. Its advantage compared to competing materials, such as boron and cadmium, is stability of absorption – most of the fusion products of Sm are other isotopes of samarium that are also good neutron absorbers. For example, the cross section of samarium-151 is 15,000 barns, it is on the order of hundreds of barns for Sm, Sm, and Sm, and 6,800 barns for natural (mixed-isotope) samarium. Among the decay products in a nuclear reactor, Sm is regarded as the second most important for the reactor design and operation after xenon-135.

Non-commercial and potential uses
Samarium-doped calcium fluoride crystals were used as an active medium in one of the first solid-state lasers designed and built by Peter Sorokin (co-inventor of the dye laser) and Mirek Stevenson at IBM research labs in early 1961. This samarium laser gave pulses of red light at 708.5 nm. It had to be cooled by liquid helium and so did not find practical applications.

Another samarium-based laser became the first saturated X-ray laser operating at wavelengths shorter than 10 nanometers. It gave 50-picosecond pulses at 7.3 and 6.8 nm suitable for uses in holography, high-resolution microscopy of biological specimens, deflectometry, interferometry, and radiography of dense plasmas related to confinement fusion and astrophysics. Saturated operation meant that the maximum possible power was extracted from the lasing medium, resulting in the high peak energy of 0.3 mJ. The active medium was samarium plasma produced by irradiating samarium-coated glass with a pulsed infrared Nd-glass laser (wavelength ~1.05 μm).

The change in electrical resistivity in samarium monochalcogenides can be used in a pressure sensor or in a memory device triggered between a low-resistance and high-resistance state by external pressure, and such devices are being developed commercially. Samarium monosulfide also generates electric voltage upon moderate heating to about  that can be applied in thermoelectric power converters.

Analysis of relative concentrations of samarium and neodymium isotopes Sm, Nd, and Nd allows determination of age and origin of rocks and meteorites in samarium–neodymium dating. Both elements are lanthanides and are very similar physically and chemically. Thus, Sm–Nd dating is either insensitive to partitioning of the marker elements during various geologic processes, or such partitioning can well be understood and modeled from the ionic radii of said elements.

Sm ion is a potential activator for use in warm-white light emitting diodes. It offers high luminous efficacy due to the narrow emission bands; but the generally low quantum efficiency and too little absorption in the UV-A to blue spectral region hinders commercial application.

In recent years it has been shown that nanocrystalline BaFCl:Sm as prepared by co-precipitation can serve as a very efficient x-ray storage phosphor. The co-precipitation leads to nanocrystallites of the order of 100-200 nm in size and their sensitivity as x-ray storage phosphors is increased an astounding ∼500,000 times because of the specific arrangements and density of defect centers in comparison with microcrystalline samples prepared by sintering at high temperature. The mechanism is based on reduction of Sm to Sm by trapping electrons that are created upon exposure to ionizing radiation in the BaFCl host. The  D- F f-f luminescence lines can be very efficiently excited via the parity allowed 4f →4f 5d transition at ~417 nm. The latter wavelength is ideal for efficient excitation by blue-violet laser diodes as the transition is electric dipole allowed and thus relatively intense (400 L/(mol⋅cm)).
The phosphor has potential applications in personal dosimetry, dosimetry and imaging in radiotherapy, and medical imaging.

Samarium is used for ionosphere testing. A rocket spreads it as a red vapor at high altitude, and researchers tests how the atmosphere disperses it and how it impacts radio transmissions.

Biological role and precautions 

Samarium salts stimulate metabolism, but it is unclear whether this is from samarium or other lanthanides present with it. The total amount of samarium in adults is about 50 μg, mostly in liver and kidneys and with ~8 μg/L being dissolved in blood. Samarium is not absorbed by plants to a measurable concentration and so is normally not part of human diet. However, a few plants and vegetables may contain up to 1 part per million of samarium. Insoluble salts of samarium are non-toxic and the soluble ones are only slightly toxic.

When ingested, only ~0.05% of samarium salts is absorbed into the bloodstream and the remainder is excreted. From the blood, ~45% goes to the liver and 45% is deposited on the surface of the bones where it remains for ~10 years; the balance 10% is excreted.

References

Bibliography

External links

It's Elemental – Samarium
Reducing Agents > Samarium low valent

 
Chemical elements
Chemical elements with rhombohedral structure
Lanthanides
Reducing agents